The 1958 Arizona Wildcats football team represented the University of Arizona in the Border Conference during the 1958 NCAA University Division football season.  In their second and final season under head coach Ed Doherty, the Wildcats compiled a 3–7 record (2–1 against Border opponents) and were outscored by their opponents, 276 to 83. The team captain was Ralph Hunsaker.  The team played its home games in Arizona Stadium in Tucson, Arizona.

The team's statistical leaders included Ralph Hunsaker with 1,129 passing yards, Billy Overall with 324 rushing yards, and Dave Hibbert with 606 receiving yards.

Schedule

References

Arizona
Arizona Wildcats football seasons
Arizona Wildcats football